Louis Dalton Porter (May 17, 1919 – June 28, 2006) was an American artist.

Porter's work includes a five-foot (1.5 meter) painted bluebird sculpture, "The Prince." Prince George's County, Maryland bought "The Prince" in 2003 and presented it as a coronation gift to its "sister city," the Royal Bafokeng Nation of South Africa.

Porter also applied gold leaf in the National Shrine of the Basilica of the Immaculate Conception in Washington, D.C., and to the domes of several government buildings.

He served as a member of the Ghost Army in World War II. As a ghost soldier, Porter created "painstakingly realistic" camouflage such as leaves and branches on material the United States Army was trying to conceal from the German Army and purposefully less realistic camouflage on dummy material designed to attract German fire, according to Jack Kneece, author of Ghost Army of World War II.

Porter was born in Kaplan, Louisiana. He grew up in Biloxi, Mississippi and Crowley, Louisiana. At the beginning of World War II he went to the Washington, D.C. area to train at Fort Belvoir and Fort Meade. After the war he settled in Prince George's County.

Porter died of a heart attack at his home in Oxon Hill, Maryland at the age of 87.

References

 Holley, Joe. (2006, July 8). Louis Dalton Porter; Used Artistic Skills to Trick German Army. The Washington Post, p. B6

External links

1919 births
2006 deaths
People from Kaplan, Louisiana
People from Oxon Hill, Maryland